Littleferry  is a village on the north east shore of Loch Fleet in Golspie, Sutherland, and is in the Scottish council area of Highland.

References

Populated places in Sutherland